Tomahawk Trail is a 1957 American Western film directed by Lesley Selander and starring Chuck Connors.

Plot summary

Sgt. Wade McCoy (Chuck Connors) deals with the Apache and rookie Lieutenant Jonathan Davenport (George N. Neise).

Cast 
 Chuck Connors as Sgt. Wade McCoy
 John Smith as Pvt. Reynolds
 Susan Cummings as Ellen Carter
 Lisa Montell as Tula
 George N. Neise as 1st. Lt. Jonathan Davenport
 Dean Stanton as Pvt. Miller
 Robert Knapp as Pvt. Barrow
 Frederick Ford as Pvt. Macy
 Boyd 'Red' Morgan as Trooper (uncredited)
 Eddie Little as Johnny Dogwood

Production
Parts of the film were shot at the Kanab movie fort and Johnson Canyon in Utah.

Home video 
MGM's Limited Edition Collection released Tomahawk Trail on DVD in the United States on May 15, 2012.

References 

 The Western by Allen Eyles
 Screen World Vol. 9 1958 by Daniel Blum

External links 
 
 
 

1957 Western (genre) films
1950s English-language films
1957 films
Western (genre) cavalry films
American Western (genre) films
United Artists films
Films shot in Utah
Films directed by Lesley Selander
1950s American films